Reginald George Trotter, FRSC (14 July 1881– 7 April 1951) was a Canadian historian. He was the Douglas Professor in Canadian and Colonial History at Queen's University, Kingston from 1924 until his death.

He was President of the Canadian Historical Association for 1938–39.

He received the J. B. Tyrrell Historical Medal in 1949.

The mathematician Hale Trotter was his son.

References 

 
 
 

1881 births
1951 deaths
20th-century Canadian historians
Presidents of the Canadian Historical Association
Fellows of the Royal Society of Canada
Academic staff of Queen's University at Kingston

Stanford University faculty
Historians of Canada
20th-century Canadian non-fiction writers